Haykakan Par is a ridge at the mid of the Armenian highland. It starts near sources of the Araxes river and stretches from the south bank as far west as Mount Ararat. The length of the ridge 200 km, the height - up to 3445 m. It was formed by a chain of volcanoes that arose along a major tectonic fault. The ridge is part of the watershed between the basins of the Caspian Sea and the Persian Gulf.

Etymology

After the Armenian genocide the ethnic composition changed. Since the 1920s the Turkish republic started the turkification of all Armenian toponyms remaining in the eastern half of present-day Turkey. The Haykakan Par mountains came under the wave of turkification and got "Agridag" or "Aras Guney Daglari" names.

References

Mountain ranges of Turkey
Mount Ararat